Calvin Gregory Maduro (born September 5, 1974) is an Aruban former professional baseball player. For most of the 2010s, he was a scout for the Baltimore Orioles.

Playing career 
Maduro was sent from the Orioles to the Phillies on September 3, 1996 in a transaction that began when Todd Zeile and Pete Incaviglia were acquired by Baltimore on August 29 and ended when Garrett Stephenson also went to Philadelphia on September 4. He played for the Phillies from 1996 to 1997 and the Orioles from 2000 to 2002. Maduro also represented the Netherlands at the 2004 Summer Olympics in Athens where he and his team finished sixth. In those years he played for the Dutch major league club HCAW.

Post-playing career 
In , Maduro was named the pitching coach for the Aberdeen IronBirds of the New York–Penn League, an Orioles farm team. After 10 years in the Orioles organization, he became the pitching coach for the Gulf Coast Twins in 2021.

Honors 
After the 2003 season, he was decorated as a Knight in the Order of Orange-Nassau, along with fellow Aruba-born baseball players Eugene Kingsale and Sidney Ponson.

References

External links
, or Retrosheet, or Pura Pelota website – VPBL statistics
Maduro at the Dutch Olympic Archive

1974 births
Águilas del Zulia players
Aruban expatriate baseball players in the United States
Atenienses de Manatí (baseball) players
Expatriate baseball players in Puerto Rico
Baltimore Orioles players
Baltimore Orioles scouts
Baseball players at the 2004 Summer Olympics
Bowie Baysox players
Cardenales de Lara players
Columbus Clippers players
Frederick Keys players
Gulf Coast Orioles players
Knights of the Order of Orange-Nassau
Leones del Caracas players
Expatriate baseball players in Venezuela
Liga de Béisbol Profesional Roberto Clemente pitchers
Living people
Major League Baseball pitchers
Major League Baseball players from Aruba
Minor league baseball coaches
Newark Bears players
Olympic baseball players of the Netherlands
People from Santa Cruz, Aruba
Philadelphia Phillies players
Rochester Red Wings players
Scranton/Wilkes-Barre Red Barons players
Tampa Yankees players
Tiburones de La Guaira players
Tigres del Licey players
Aruban expatriate baseball players in the Dominican Republic
Trenton Thunder players